Paul Bunyan is a mythical lumberjack.

Paul Bunyan may also refer to:

Paul Bunyan (novel), a 1924 novel written by Esther Shephard and illustrated by Rockwell Kent
Paul Bunyan (book), a 1925 book by James Stevens
Paul Bunyan (film), a 1958 Walt Disney film, directed by Les Clark
Paul Bunyan (operetta), a 1941 choral operetta composed by Benjamin Britten
Paul Bunyan and Babe the Blue Ox, a 1937 set of statues in Minnesota
Paul Bunyan's Axe, a traveling trophy passed between the University of Minnesota and the University of Wisconsin
Paul Bunyan Broadcasting, a broadcasting company based in Bemidji, Minnesota 
Paul Bunyan Land, an amusement park in Brainerd, Minnesota
Paul Bunyan Network, a group of radio stations in Michigan
Paul Bunyan State Trail, a rail trail in Minnesota
Paul Bunyan Trophy, a college rivalry trophy awarded to the winner of the annual American football game between the University of Michigan and Michigan State University
Operation Paul Bunyan, a show of force by the United States military in response to an attack by North Korean soldiers
SS Paul Bunyan, a cargo ship built in the United States during World War II
Paul Bunyan, the former stage name of professional wrestler Max Palmer.